Yasmin Hurd is the Ward-Coleman Chair of Translational Neuroscience and the Director of the Addiction Institute at Mount Sinai. Hurd holds appointments as faculty of Neuroscience, Psychiatry, Pharmacology and Systems Therapeutics at the Icahn School of Medicine at Mount Sinai in New York City and is globally recognized for her translational research on the underlying neurobiology of substance use disorders and comorbid psychiatric disorders. Hurd's research on the transgenerational effects of early cannabis exposure on the developing brain and behavior and on the therapeutic properties of marijuana has garnered substantial media attention.

Early life and education 
As a child growing up in Jamaica, Hurd was particularly interested in how the brain works. To aid in covering her expenses for college, she decided to work in a research lab, which required her to take care of animals. This experience was one that sparked her childhood curiosity and set her on a path to a career in neuroscience research. She completed her PhD at the Karolinska Institutet in Stockholm, Sweden, where her work with micro-dialysis led to advances in neuropharmacology.  She spent time as a Pharmacology Research Associate Fellow with the National Institutes of Health and Staff Fellow at the National Institute of Mental Health.

Career 
Hurd's career began when she returned to her alma mater, Karolinska Institute as a faculty member and professor for 13 years before beginning her career at Mount Sinai. At Mount Sinai, Hurd is currently the Ward-Coleman Chair of Translational Neuroscience and the Director of the Addiction Institute of Mount Sinai within the Behavioral Health System.

She is also the former director of the medical school's combined MD/PhD Medical Scientist Training Program. Hurd served on advisory boards including the Clinical Neuroendocrinology Branch, National Institute of Mental Health (NIMH), National Institute of Drug Abuse (NIDA) Board of Scientific Counselors and the Center for Scientific Review (CSR) advisory Council.

Hurd is a professor at the Icahn School of Medicine at Mount Sinai Hospital in New York City, where she studies addiction in people and animal models. Her animal research has revealed that drugs like marijuana can have profound effects on the developing and fetal adolescent brain, including effects that can even extend to the future generations of drug-users.

She is also a member of the National Academy of Medicine, American Society for Neuroscience, New York Academy of Sciences, and the College on Problems of Drug Dependence. Hurd's work has been cited more than 13,000 times, and she has an H-Index of 69.

Her work on the neurobiology of addiction, especially with regard to the effects of heroin and the developmental changes caused by cannabis, have been profiled in a variety of popular news and documentary sources.

Research 
Hurd’s research focuses on the effects of cannabis and heroin on the brain. Her pre-clinical research is complemented with clinical laboratory investigations evaluating the therapeutic potential of medications such as the use of phytocannabinoids in the treatment of psychiatric disorders.  One area of concentration has set out to address the gateway drug theory. Her research showed that CBD could be considered as a potentially significant option for treating patients recovering from opioid abuse, a finding that has received public attention.

Grants 
Ongoing research grants as of 2020:

Publications
Partial list ranked by third-party citations:

 Maze, Ian; Covington, Herbert E.; Dietz, David M.; LaPlant, Quincey; Renthal, William; Russo, Scott J.; Mechanic, Max; Mouzon, Ezekiell; Neve, Rachael L.; Haggarty, Stephen J.; Ren, Yanhua (2010-01-08). "Essential role of the histone methyltransferase G9a in cocaine-induced plasticity". Science. 327 (5962): 213–216. doi:10.1126/science.1179438. ISSN 1095-9203. PMC 2820240  Cited by 511 publications.
 LaPlant, Quincey; Vialou, Vincent; Covington, Herbert E.; Dumitriu, Dani; Feng, Jian; Warren, Brandon L.; Maze, Ian; Dietz, David M.; Watts, Emily L.; Iñiguez, Sergio D.; Koo, Ja Wook (2010-09). "Dnmt3a regulates emotional behavior and spine plasticity in the nucleus accumbens". Nature Neuroscience. 13 (9): 1137–1143. doi:10.1038/nn.2619.  Cited by 449 publications.
 Caberlotto, Laura; Hurd, Yasmin L.; Murdock, Paul; Wahlin, Jean Philippe; Melotto, Sergio; Corsi, Mauro; Carletti, Renzo (2003). "Neurokinin 1 receptor and relative abundance of the short and long isoforms in the human brain". European Journal of Neuroscience. 17 (9): 1736–1746.  Cited by 393 publications.
 Östlund, Hanna; Keller, Eva; Hurd, Yasmin L. (2003). "Estrogen Receptor Gene Expression in Relation to Neuropsychiatric Disorders". Annals of the New York Academy of Sciences. 1007 (1): 54–63. doi:10.1196/annals.1286.006. ISSN 1749-6632  Cited by 246 publications. 
 Österlund, Marie; G.J.M. Kuiper, George; Gustafsson, Jan-Åke; Hurd, Yasmin L (1998-02-01). "Differential distribution and regulation of estrogen receptor-α and -β mRNA within the female rat brain1First published on the World Wide Web on 10 December 1997.1". Molecular Brain Research. 54 (1): 175–180. doi:10.1016/S0169-328X(97)00351-3. ISSN  Cited by 390 publications.  
 Caberlotto, Laura; Jimenez, Patricia; Overstreet, David H.; Hurd, Yasmin L.; Mathé, Aleksander A.; Fuxe, Kjell (1999-4). "Alterations in neuropeptide Y levels and Y1 binding sites in the Flinders Sensitive Line rats, a genetic animal model of depression". Neuroscience Letters. 265 (3): 191–194. doi:10.1016/S0304-3940(99)00234-7  Cited by 357 publications. 
 Hurd, Yasmin L.; Herkenham, Miles (1993). "Molecular alterations in the neostriatum of human cocaine addicts". Synapse. 13 (4): 357–369. doi:10.1002/syn.890130408  Cited by 309 publications.

Professional affiliations 
A partial list of professional affiliations and committees includes:

Elected Member, National Academy of Medicine; American Society for Neuroscience; New York Academy of Sciences; The College on Problems of Drug Dependence; Vice-Chair, ACNP Minority Task Force; Editorial Board Member, Biological Psychiatry; Brain & Behavior Research Foundation, Scientific Council member; Editorial Board Member, Cannabis and Cannabinoid Research; Editorial Board, National Academies’ Forum on Neuroscience and Nervous System Disorders, and member, the SfN Public Education and Communication Committee.

Professional societies include:

American College Neuropsychopharmacology, Society for Neuroscience, New York Academy of Sciences, College on Problems of Drug Dependence, and the Society for Biological Psychiatry.

References

Year of birth missing (living people)
Living people
American neuroscientists
American women neuroscientists
Icahn School of Medicine at Mount Sinai faculty
Binghamton University alumni
Karolinska Institute alumni
Members of the National Academy of Medicine
American women academics
21st-century American women